Death Song can refer to:

"Death Song" or "", a 1926 song by Korean singer Yun Sim-deok
Death Song (film), a 1991 film about Yun Sim-deok, named for the 1926 song
"The Black Angel's Death Song", a 1967 song by the American band Velvet Underground
"Death-Song of Conan the Cimmerian", a 1972 poem by American author Lin Carter
Death Song (album), a 2017 album by The Black Angels
"Death's Song", a 2013 song by City and Colour from the album The Hurry and the Harm

See also
Death (disambiguation)#Albums and songs
Dirge
Lament